The Jewish Enquirer (titled Hapless on My5) is a British comedy web series. It premiered on Amazon Prime Video on 28 February 2020 in the UK and Ireland, followed by release in the USA on 30 March 2020.
It then launched on Netflix in the UK and Ireland on November 1, 2021.

Premise
The show follows the life of Paul Green who is an investigative journalist for The Jewish Enquirer, described as "the 4th biggest Jewish publication in the UK".

Cast
Tim Downie as Paul Green
Josh Howie as Simon
Lucy Montgomery as Naomi

Reception
The show has been likened to Curb Your Enthusiasm and Alan Partridge. Front Row called the show "Seinfeld in North London". The Times of Israel compared the character of Paul Green to Larry David in Curb Your Enthusiasm and John Cleese's Basil Fawlty in Fawlty Towers.

References

2020 British television series debuts
2020 British television series endings
Amazon Prime Video original programming
English-language television shows
Television shows set in London
Jewish television